Kocia Górka  is a village in the administrative district of Gmina Lubanie, within Włocławek County, Kuyavian-Pomeranian Voivodeship, in north-central Poland. Located in the Beskidy Mountains.

References

Villages in Włocławek County